In mathematics, the Pell numbers are an infinite sequence of integers, known since ancient times, that comprise the denominators of the closest rational approximations to the square root of 2. The numerators of the same sequence of approximations are half the companion Pell numbers or Pell–Lucas numbers; these numbers form a second infinite sequence that begins with 2, 6, 14, 34, and 82.

Both the Pell numbers and the companion Pell numbers may be calculated by means of a recurrence relation similar to that for the Fibonacci numbers, and both sequences of numbers grow exponentially, proportionally to powers of the silver ratio 1 + . As well as being used to approximate the square root of two, Pell numbers can be used to find square triangular numbers, to construct integer approximations to the right isosceles triangle, and to solve certain combinatorial enumeration problems.

As with Pell's equation, the name of the Pell numbers stems from Leonhard Euler's mistaken attribution of the equation and the numbers derived from it to John Pell. The Pell–Lucas numbers are also named after Édouard Lucas, who studied sequences defined by recurrences of this type; the Pell and companion Pell numbers are Lucas sequences.

Pell numbers 

The Pell numbers are defined by the recurrence relation:

In words, the sequence of Pell numbers starts with 0 and 1, and then each Pell number is the sum of twice the previous Pell number and the Pell number before that. The first few terms of the sequence are
0, 1, 2, 5, 12, 29, 70, 169, 408, 985, 2378, 5741, 13860, … .

The Pell numbers can also be expressed by the closed form formula

For large values of n, the  term dominates this expression, so the Pell numbers are approximately proportional to powers of the silver ratio , analogous to the growth rate of Fibonacci numbers as powers of the golden ratio.

A third definition is possible, from the matrix formula

Many identities can be derived or proven from these definitions; for instance an identity analogous to Cassini's identity for Fibonacci numbers,

is an immediate consequence of the matrix formula (found by considering the determinants of the matrices on the left and right sides of the matrix formula).

Approximation to the square root of two 

If two large integers x and y form a solution to the Pell equation

The sequence of approximations of this form is

where the denominator of each fraction is a Pell number and the numerator is the sum of a Pell number and its predecessor in the sequence. That is, the solutions have the form

The approximation

of this type was known to Indian mathematicians in the third or fourth century B.C. The Greek mathematicians of the fifth century B.C. also knew of this sequence of approximations: Plato refers to the numerators as rational diameters. In the 2nd century CE Theon of Smyrna used the term the  side and diameter numbers to describe the denominators and numerators of this sequence.

These approximations can be derived from the continued fraction expansion of :

Truncating this expansion to any number of terms produces one of the Pell-number-based approximations in this sequence; for instance,

All vertices are equally distant from the origin, and form nearly uniform angles around the origin.

Primes and squares 

A Pell prime is a Pell number that is prime. The first few Pell primes are
2, 5, 29, 5741, 33461, 44560482149, 1746860020068409, 68480406462161287469, ... .
The indices of these primes within the sequence of all Pell numbers are
2, 3, 5, 11, 13, 29, 41, 53, 59, 89, 97, 101, 167, 181, 191, 523, 929, 1217, 1301, 1361, 2087, 2273, 2393, 8093, ... 
These indices are all themselves prime. As with the Fibonacci numbers, a Pell number Pn can only be prime if n itself is prime, because if d is a divisor of n then Pd is a divisor of Pn.

The only Pell numbers that are squares, cubes, or any higher power of an integer are 0, 1, and 169 = 132.

However, despite having so few squares or other powers, Pell numbers have a close connection to square triangular numbers. Specifically, these numbers arise from the following identity of Pell numbers:

The left side of this identity describes a square number, while the right side describes a triangular number, so the result is a square triangular number.

Falcón and Díaz-Barrero (2006) proved another identity relating Pell numbers to squares and showing that the sum of the Pell numbers up to P4n&hairsp;+1 is always a square:

The numbers  forming the square roots of these sums,
1, 7, 41, 239, 1393, 8119, 47321, … ,
are known as the Newman–Shanks–Williams (NSW) numbers.

Pythagorean triples 

If a right triangle has integer side lengths a, b, c (necessarily satisfying the Pythagorean theorem ), then (a,b,c) is known as a Pythagorean triple. As Martin (1875) describes, the Pell numbers can be used to form Pythagorean triples in which a and b are one unit apart, corresponding to right triangles that are nearly isosceles. Each such triple has the form

The sequence of Pythagorean triples formed in this way is
(4,3,5), (20,21,29), (120,119,169), (696,697,985), …

Pell–Lucas numbers 

The companion Pell numbers or Pell–Lucas numbers are defined by the recurrence relation

In words: the first two numbers in the sequence are both 2, and each successive number is formed by adding twice the previous Pell–Lucas number to the Pell–Lucas number before that, or equivalently, by adding the next Pell number to the previous Pell number: thus, 82 is the companion to 29, and  The first few terms of the sequence are : 2, 2, 6, 14, 34, 82, 198, 478, …

Like the relationship between Fibonacci numbers and Lucas numbers,

for all natural numbers n.

The companion Pell numbers can be expressed by the closed form formula

These numbers are all even; each such number is twice the numerator in one of the rational approximations to  discussed above.

Like the Lucas sequence, if a Pell–Lucas number Qn is prime, it is necessary that n be either prime or a power of 2. The Pell–Lucas primes are
3, 7, 17, 41, 239, 577, … .

For these n are 
2, 3, 4, 5, 7, 8, 16, 19, 29, 47, 59, 163, 257, 421, … .

Computations and connections

The following table gives the first few powers of the silver ratio δ = δS = 1 +  and its conjugate  = 1 − . 
{| class="wikitable" style="text-align:center"
|-
! n
! (1 + )n
! (1 − )n
|-
! 0
| 1 + 0 = 1
| 1 − 0 = 1
|-
! 1
| 1 + 1 = 2.41421…
| 1 − 1 = −0.41421…
|-
! 2
| 3 + 2 = 5.82842…
| 3 − 2 = 0.17157…
|-
! 3
| 7 + 5 = 14.07106…
| 7 − 5 = −0.07106…
|-
! 4
| 17 + 12 = 33.97056…
| 17 − 12 = 0.02943…
|-
! 5
| 41 + 29 = 82.01219…
| 41 − 29 = −0.01219…
|-
! 6
| 99 + 70 = 197.9949…
| 99 − 70 = 0.0050…
|-
! 7
| 239 + 169 = 478.00209…
| 239 − 169 = −0.00209…
|-
! 8
| 577 + 408 = 1153.99913…
| 577 − 408 = 0.00086…
|-
! 9
| 1393 + 985 = 2786.00035…
| 1393 − 985 = −0.00035…
|-
! 10
| 3363 + 2378 = 6725.99985…
| 3363 − 2378 = 0.00014…
|-
! 11
| 8119 + 5741 = 16238.00006…
| 8119 − 5741 = −0.00006…
|-
! 12
| 19601 + 13860 = 39201.99997…
| 19601 − 13860 = 0.00002…
|}

A square triangular number is a number

which is both the t-th triangular number and the s-th square number. A near-isosceles Pythagorean triple is an integer solution to  where .

The next table shows that splitting the odd number Hn into nearly equal halves gives a square triangular number when n is even and a near isosceles Pythagorean triple when n is odd. All solutions arise in this manner.

{| class="wikitable" style="text-align:center"
|-
!n
!Hn
!Pn
!t
!t + 1
!s
!a
!b
!c
|-
!0
|1
|0
|0
|1
|0
|style="background: grey;"| 
|style="background: grey;"| 
|style="background: grey;"| 
|-
!1
|1
|1
|style="background: grey;"| 
|style="background: grey;"| 
|style="background: grey;"| 
|0
|1
|1
|-
!2
|3
|2
|1
|2
|1
|style="background: grey;"| 
|style="background: grey;"| 
|style="background: grey;"| 
|-
!3
|7
|5
|style="background: grey;"| 
|style="background: grey;"| 
|style="background: grey;"| 
|3
|4
|5
|-
!4
|17
|12
|8
|9
|6
|style="background: grey;"| 
|style="background: grey;"| 
|style="background: grey;"| 
|-
!5
|41
|29
|style="background: grey;"| 
|style="background: grey;"| 
|style="background: grey;"| 
|20
|21
|29
|-
!6
|99
|70
|49
|50
|35
|style="background: grey;"| 
|style="background: grey;"| 
|style="background: grey;"| 
|-
!7
|239
|169
|style="background: grey;"| 
|style="background: grey;"| 
|style="background: grey;"| 
|119
|120
|169
|-
!8
|577
|408
|288
|289
|204
|style="background: grey;"| 
|style="background: grey;"| 
|style="background: grey;"| 
|-
!9
|1393
|985
|style="background: grey;"| 
|style="background: grey;"| 
|style="background: grey;"| 
|696
|697
|985
|-
!10
|3363
|2378
|1681
|1682
|1189
|style="background: grey;"| 
|style="background: grey;"| 
|style="background: grey;"| 
|-
!11
|8119
|5741
|style="background: grey;"| 
|style="background: grey;"| 
|style="background: grey;"| 
|4059
|4060
|5741
|-
!12
|19601
|13860
|9800
|9801
|6930
|style="background: grey;"| 
|style="background: grey;"| 
|style="background: grey;"| 
|}

Definitions
The half-companion Pell numbers Hn and the Pell numbers Pn can be derived in a number of easily equivalent ways.

Raising to powers

From this it follows that there are closed forms:

and

Paired recurrences

Reciprocal recurrence formulas
Let n be at least 2.
;
.

Matrix formulations

So

Approximations 

The difference between Hn and Pn is

which goes rapidly to zero. So 

is extremely close to 2Hn.

H2 − 2P2 = ±1 

Since  is irrational, we cannot have  = , i.e.,

The best we can achieve is either

To see this, note first that

1 and −1. Then note that every positive solution comes in this way from a solution with smaller integers since 

The smaller solution also has positive integers, with the one exception:  which comes from H0 = 1 and P0 = 0.

Square triangular numbers 

The required equation

is equivalent to 
which becomes  with the substitutions H = 2t + 1 and P = 2s. Hence the n-th solution is

Observe that t and t + 1 are relatively prime, so that  = s2 happens exactly when they are adjacent integers, one a square H&hairsp;&hairsp;2 and the other twice a square 2P&hairsp;&hairsp;2. Since we know all solutions of that equation, we also have

and 

This alternate expression is seen in the next table.

{| class="wikitable" style="text-align:center"
|-
!n
!Hn
!Pn
!t
!t + 1
!s
!a
!b
!c
|-
!0
|1
|0
|style="background: grey;"| 
|style="background: grey;"| 
|style="background: grey;"| 
|style="background: grey;"| 
|style="background: grey;"| 
|style="background: grey;"| 
|-
!1
|1
|1
|1
|2
|1
|3
|4
|5
|-
!2
|3
|2
|8
|9
|6
|20
|21
|29
|-
!3
|7
|5
|49
|50
|35
|119
|120
|169
|-
!4
|17
|12
|288
|289
|204
|696
|697
|985
|-
!5
|41
|29
|1681
|1682
|1189
|4059
|4060
|5741
|-
!6
|99
|70
|9800
|9801
|6930
|23660
|23661
|33461
|}

Pythagorean triples 

Notes

References

External links 

 —The numerators of the same sequence of approximations

Integer sequences
Recurrence relations
Unsolved problems in mathematics